Michael Blake may refer to:
Michael Blake (author) (1945–2015), American author, best known for his film adaptation of his novel Dances with Wolves
Michael Blake (bishop) (1775–1860), Irish Roman Catholic bishop of Dromore
Michael Blake (composer) (born 1951), South African contemporary classical music composer
Michael Blake (musician) (born 1964), Canadian musician
Michael Blake (politician)  (born 1982), New York Assembly member
Michael Blake (rugby league) (born 1961), Australian former rugby league footballer
Michael F. Blake (1857–1929), judge in New York City
Mick Blake (1874–1931), Australian rules footballer
Mike Blake, character in Alabama Moon

See also
 Blake (surname)
 Blake Michael (born 1996), American actor